Daniel Harry Lovitz (born August 27, 1991) is an American professional soccer player who plays as a defender for Nashville SC in Major League Soccer.

Club career

Early career
Lovitz grew up playing youth soccer in Eastern Pennsylvania for Lower Merion Soccer Club Velez.
He played high school soccer for Germantown Academy followed by four years of college soccer at Elon University, making 80 appearances, scoring nine goals and added 16 assists.

In 2010, Lovitz was named to the Southern Conference all-freshman team. Lovitz was named to the 2012 SoCon all-tournament team. In 2013 Lovitz was named the Southern Conference Player of the Year after leading the Phoenix to a third straight conference tournament title and NCAA Tournament berth.

While at college, Lovitz also appeared for USL PDL club Carolina Dynamo during their 2012 and 2013 season's.

Toronto FC
On January 16, 2014, Lovitz was drafted in the second round (24th overall) of the 2014 MLS SuperDraft by Toronto FC. He was loaned to Toronto's USL Pro affiliate Wilmington Hammerheads in March 2014 along with Quillan Roberts and Manny Aparicio. Lovitz made his professional debut in a 0–0 draw with Harrisburg City Islanders on April 5, 2014. The following week Lovitz scored his first goal against Pittsburgh Riverhounds in a 4–3 away victory. On December 12, Lovitz was selected by New York City FC in the 2014 MLS Expansion Draft. However, hours later Toronto announced that they had re-acquired Lovitz from New York in exchange for allocation money. In 2015, Lovitz made 11 appearances, starting three for Toronto FC.

Montreal Impact
On February 28, 2017, Daniel Lovitz signed with the Montreal Impact.

Nashville SC
On November 19, 2019, Lovitz was traded to Nashville SC in exchange for $50,000 in General Allocation Money and $50,000 in Targeted Allocation Money.

International
He made his debut for the United States national team on January 27, 2019 in a friendly against Panama, as a starter. He was also named to the 2019 Gold Cup squad, and has continued to feature at left back for the United States national team throughout 2019. Despite this, Lovitz has received criticism for his performance for the national team, referring to his talent and technical ability to play at the international level.

All 13 of his national team appearances came in 2019.

Career statistics

Club

International 

Source: US Soccer

Honors 
Montreal Impact
Canadian Championship: 2019

References

External links 

1991 births
Living people
American soccer players
American expatriate soccer players
Elon Phoenix men's soccer players
North Carolina Fusion U23 players
Toronto FC players
Toronto FC II players
Wilmington Hammerheads FC players
Association football midfielders
Soccer players from Pennsylvania
Sportspeople from Montgomery County, Pennsylvania
Toronto FC draft picks
Expatriate soccer players in Canada
USL Championship players
USL League Two players
Major League Soccer players
CF Montréal players
United States men's international soccer players
2019 CONCACAF Gold Cup players
Association football fullbacks
Nashville SC players